Peziotrichum corticola is an ascomycete fungus that is a plant pathogen. It was first discovered in India by Massee. Rhinocladium corticola is a known synonym.

P. corticola causes black-band disease on the leaves and bark of mango trees. Black-band disease is little known, but highly infectious; it has caused significant damage to mango yield in India since 2009.

References 

Fungal plant pathogens and diseases
Nectriaceae